Fleur Savelkoel (born ) is a Dutch volleyball player, active in the highest Dutch volleyball League since 2012.

On club level she played for New Nexus Apps/Lycurgus in 2015, GSVV Donitas in 2016, and is currently playing at three times national championship winner Sliedrecht Sport. With Sliedrecht Sport, she also reached the national cupfinals 4 times in a row, of which they won the last 3 editions. Besides that, Sliedrecht managed to win the ‘Supercup’ in 2017, 2018 and 2019.

With her current club, Savelkoel  participated in European competitions in 2017 (Championsleague & CEV Cup), 2018 (Championsleague & CEV Cup) and 2019 (CEV Cup).

References

1995 births
Living people
Dutch women's volleyball players
Sportspeople from Deventer